Daniele Manin (13 May 180422 September 1857) was an Italian patriot, statesman and leader of the Risorgimento in Venice. Many Italian historians consider him to be an important figure in Italian unification.

Early and family life

Daniele Manin was born Daniele Fonseca in Ramo Astori, Venice, where his birthplace is commemorated by a plaque. His mother Anna Maria Bellotto, an Italian, came from Padua, while his father Pietro Antonio Fonseca (1762–1829) came from a converted family that was originally Jewish: Daniele's grandfather was Samuele Medina, from Verona. Samuele converted to Christianity in 1759 and took the name Manin because Ludovico Manin, the last Doge of Venice, sponsored his conversion. Daniele Manin studied law at Padua and then practised at the bar in Venice, his native city.  A man of great learning and a profound jurist, from an early age he held a deep hatred for Austria.

Manin's niece was the painter and printmaker Leopoldina Zanetti Borzino.

Revolutionary leader
A failed attempt by the Bandiera Brothers, Venetians who had served in the Austrian navy against the Neapolitan Bourbons in 1844, was the first event to cause an awakening of Venetian patriotism.  In 1847 Manin presented a petition to the Venetian congregation, a powerless consultative assembly tolerated by Austria, informing the emperor of the wants of the nation. He was arrested on a charge of high treason (18 January 1848), but his arrest only served to agitate of the Venetians, who were beginning to appreciate Manin.

Two months later, when all of Italy and half of the rest of Europe were in the throes of revolution, the people of Venice forced Count Pallfy (Erdődy Pállfy Alajos gróf), the Austrian governor, to release Manin (17 March). The Austrians soon lost control of the city: the Arsenal was seized by revolutionaries and, under the direction of Manin, a civic guard and a provisional government were instituted. The Austrians withdrew from Venice on 26 March and Manin became president of the re-created Republic of San Marco. He had already been in favour of Italian unity but was not anxious about annexation to Piedmont because he would have liked to enlist French aid.  He gave in to the will of the majority of his compatriots and resigned his powers to the Piedmontese commissioners on 7 August. But after the Piedmontese defeat at Custoza, and the armistice in which King Charles Albert abandoned Lombardy and Venetia to Austria, the Venetians attempted to lynch the royal commissioners, whose lives Manin saved with difficulty. An assembly was summoned, and a triumvirate formed with Manin at its head.

Towards the end of 1848 the Austrians, having been heavily reinforced, reoccupied all the Venetian mainland. The citizens, however, hard-pressed and threatened with a siege, showed the greatest devotion to the cause of freedom, all sharing in the dangers and hardships and giving what they could afford to the state treasury.  Early in 1849 Manin was again chosen president of the Republic, and conducted the defence of the city with great ability.

After the defeat of Charles Albert's troops at Novara in March, the Venetian assembly voted "Resistance at all costs!" and granted Manin unlimited powers.

Meanwhile, the Austrian forces closed around the city. Manin showed a good capability of organization, in which he was ably seconded by the Neapolitan general, Guglielmo Pepe, who led the Neapolitan army to defend Venice against his king's order.  But on 26 May the Venetians were forced to abandon Fort Marghera, halfway between the city and the mainland; food was becoming scarce, on 19 June the powder magazine blew up, and in July cholera broke out. The Austrian batteries, subsequently, began to bombard Venice itself, and when the Sardinian fleet withdrew from the Adriatic the city was also attacked by sea, while demagogues caused internal trouble.

At last, on 24 August 1849, when all provisions and ammunition were exhausted, Manin, who had courted death in vain, succeeded in negotiating an honourable capitulation, on terms of amnesty to all save Manin himself, Pepe and some others, who were to go into exile. On 27 August Manin left Venice forever on board a French ship.

Exile and last years
His wife died at Marseille, and he himself reached Paris broken in health and almost destitute, having spent all his fortune for Venice.

In Paris, he maintained himself by teaching and became a leader among the Italian exiles. There he became a convert from republicanism to monarchism, being convinced that only under the auspices of King Victor Emmanuel could Italy be freed, and together with Giorgio Pallavicini and Giuseppe La Farina he founded the Società Nazionale Italiana with the object of propagating the idea of unity under the Piedmontese monarchy.

His final years were embittered by his daughter's illness, who died in 1854. He died on 22 September 1857 and was buried in Ary Scheffer's family tomb.

In 1868, two years after the Austrians finally departed from Venice, his remains were brought to his native city and honoured with a public funeral. The gondola carrying his coffin was decorated with bow "surmounted by the lion of Saint Mark, resplendent with gold", bore "the Venetian standard veiled with black crape", and had "two silver colossal statues waving the national colours of Italy". The statues represented the unification of Italy and Venice. The funeral procession was described as "magnificent". His remains are interred in a sarcophagus, which is located in the Piazzetta dei Leoncini, on the north side of the Basilica San Marco.

Evaluation
According to the Encyclopædia Britannica Eleventh Edition,

Notes

Sources

  This cites:
 A. Errera, Vita di D. Manin (Venice, 1872)
 P. de la Farge, Documents, &c., de D. Manin (Paris, 1860)
 Henri Martin, D. Manin (Paris, 1859)
 V. Marchesi, Settant' anni della storia di Venezia (Turin)
 A monograph in Countess Martinengo Cesaresco's Italian Characters (London, 1901)

External links
 
Errera, Rosa, (1923), Manin,
 
 
 
 
 
 

1804 births
1857 deaths
Politicians of Veneto
Politicians from Venice
Italian people of the Italian unification
Revolutions of 1848 in the Italian states
Exiled Italian politicians
University of Padua alumni
Italian people of Jewish descent